Happy Birthday, Marsha! is a fictional short film that imagines the gay and transgender rights pioneers Marsha P. Johnson and Sylvia Rivera in the hours that led up to the 1969 Stonewall riots in New York City. The film stars Mya Taylor as Johnson.

It was written, directed, and produced by Tourmaline and Sasha Wortzel. The filmmakers raised over $25,000 on Kickstarter to fund the film. The film is a sponsored project of Women Make Movies.

The film premiered in Los Angeles in March 2018. The film also showed at the 2018 BFI London Flare LGBTQ+ Film Festival.

The film received some press after Tourmaline accused David France of using some of her labor in his own film, The Death and Life of Marsha P. Johnson, on Johnson's life, which France denied.

Historical accuracy
The film has been described as "ahistorical", as it has some major historical discrepancies. The movie claims that Johnson was throwing a birthday party on June 28, the night of Stonewall riot, but that was impossible since Johnson's birthday has been documented to be August 24. The movie claims that Sylvia Rivera was fighting with Marsha P Johnson in the riot, but her presence has been denied by many Stonewall veterans, including Johnson herself. Johnson claimed that Rivera has "fallen asleep in Bryant Park after taking heroin" at the outbreak of the Stonewall riot and that Johnson "woke her up to tell her about the riots."

The film depicts Johnson as the first person to fight back the police, but that account was also denied by Johnson herself, who stated that she arrived at the bar at two o' clock, and "the place was already on fire... it was a raid already. The riots had already started." Therefore, Johnson could not have been the first person to fight back at the riot.

References

External links
Official website

American LGBT-related short films
Films about trans women
LGBT-related drama films
2018 LGBT-related films
2018 drama films
African-American LGBT-related films
LGBT-related films based on actual events
Films set in 1969
Kickstarter-funded films
Biographical films about LGBT people
2010s English-language films
2010s American films
American drama short films